Laurentian Codex or Laurentian Letopis is a collection of chronicles that includes the oldest extant version of the Primary Chronicle and its continuations, mostly  relating the events in Northern Russia (Vladimir-Suzdal).

The scribe and his source 
The codex was not just copied by the Nizhegorod monk Laurentius commissioned by Dionysius of Suzdal in 1377. The original text on events from 1284 to 1305 was a lost codex compiled for the Grand Duke Mikhail of Tver in 1305, but Laurentius re-edited the presentation of Yuri Vsevolodovich, the founder of Nizhny Novgorod, from positive into a negative, partly rehabilitating the role of Tatars. Vasily Komarovich studied traces of changes within the manuscript and established a hypothesis about differences between Laurentius' version and the lost one of the Tver chronicle.

Content 
The Laurentian Codex compiled several codices of the Vladimir chronicles. It is the second edition of Nestor's chronicle, which had been already revised in 1116 by Sylvester, Hegumen of the St. Michael Monastery in the village of Vydubychi, under the reign of Prince Vladimir Monomakh, and it is the oldest version known today. The codex is a unique source for the autobiographical chronicle called Instruction of Vladimir Monomakh.

The first part until folio 40 verso was written by an unknown scribe commissioned by Andrew Bogolyubsky. In 1177 it was completed after the assassination of the prince. The second chronicle about Vsevolod the Big Nest continued up to 1193. The third which did glorify Vsevolod, was composed in 1212 by his son Yuri Vsevolodovich. The Vladimir Chronicles borrowed from sources of the Southern Rus', especially from Pereiaslav, since Vladimir princes regarded the city as part of their patrimony.

The compilation referred to various periods until 1305, but the years 898–922, 1263–1283 and 1288–1294 had been omitted for reasons of censorship, and quite likely under supervision of Dionysios, Metropolitan of Kyiv. The revision was done under great rush and another hand in the manuscript proves, that Laurentius' work was assisted by a second scribe whose hand can be found on the later added folios 157, 167, and on the verso side of folio 161.

History of the manuscript 
The manuscript was acquired by the famous Count Musin-Pushkin in 1792 and subsequently presented to the Russian National Library in St Petersburg (Ms. F.п.IV.2).

See also 
 Solar eclipse of 1 May 1185

References

Sources

Critical edition

Translations 
 [digitisation of the Laurentian Codex, including transliteration and translation into modern Russian, with an introduction in English]

External links

Real photos, OCS text, modern Russian translation
Old Church Slavonic text similar to original in pdf format
from The Complete Collection of Russian Chronicles 
The House of Count Aleksei Musin-Pushkin (1744–1818) in St. Petersburg. Here was stored Laurentian Codex

1377 books
East Slavic chronicles
14th-century manuscripts
Cyrillic manuscripts